Below is the list of Vietnamese historical drama films:

List of Vietnamese historical drama films

Films set in the Ancient Age

Films set in the Feudal Age (214 BC — 1945)

Films set in the Âu Lạc Period (214 — 111 BC)

Films set in the Chinese-dominating period (111 BC — 938)

Films set in the Independence period (938 — 1945)

Films set in the Modern Age (1945—)

Films set in unknown time

See also 

 list of Asian historical drama films

References

Historical
Vietnamese